The Karamoja apalis (Apalis karamojae) is a species of bird in the family Cisticolidae. It is found in Tanzania, Uganda and Kenya.

Its natural habitat is subtropical or tropical moist shrubland with a particular preference for stands of whistling thorn Acacia drepanolobium. It is threatened by habitat loss.

References

Karamoja apalis
Birds of East Africa
Karamoja apalis
Taxonomy articles created by Polbot